Huron High School in New Boston, Michigan is a public high school offering education for grades 9 to 12. It is part of the Huron School District.

Demographics

The demographic breakdown of the 914 students enrolled for the 2014–15 school year was:

Male - 50.2%
Female - 49.8%
Native American/Alaskan - 1.0%
Asian/Pacific islanders - 0.9%
Black - 3.2%
Hispanic - 3.3%
White - 89.5%
Multiracial - 2.1%

24.3% of the students were eligible for free or reduced lunch.

Athletics
The Chiefs compete in the Huron League. The school colors are red and white.  The following MHSAA sanctioned sports are offered:

Baseball (boys)
Basketball (boys and girls)
Bowling (boys and girls)
Competitive cheer (girls)
Cross country (boys and girls)
Football (boys) 
Golf (boys and girls)
Ice hockey (boys)
Soccer (boys and girls)
Softball (girls)
Swim and dive (girls)
Tennis (boys and girls)
Track and field (boys and girls)
Volleyball (girls)
Wrestling (boys)

References

External links

Huron School District

Public high schools in Michigan
Schools in Wayne County, Michigan